Gower Gulch is a small gulch on the eastern side of Death Valley in Inyo County, California. It is located in the Black Mountains.  Gower Gulch is visible from Zabriskie Point and is about one and a half miles long.

History
Gower Gulch is named after Harry P. Gower, an official of the Pacific Coast Borax Company and co-owner of the Furnace Creek Inn and Ranch, before Death Valley became a national monument.  The gulch contained mines, camps, and roads during the late 19th century and early 20th century.

Geology
Gower Gulch passes through three geological formations: 
the Badlands in the easternmost portion
the Artist's Palette Formation mid channel
the Playa Formation at the channel head.
There are two areas of dry waterfalls: the Upper Knickzone near Zabriskie Point and the Lower Knickzone near the gulch's Alluvial fan.  The tallest fall, at the head of the alluvial fan, is approximately 25 ft. high, the only way around it being a ledge on the northern side of the fan.  The alluvial fan has a deep channel, called a telescoping channel, that runs north-west from Gower Gulch's mouth.

Mining
Gower Gulch was mined in after the 1880s, when a  road starting at the northern side of Zabriskie Point was built by the Pacific Coast Borax Company.  This road allowed wagons and autos to reach the ten borax mine claims in the gulch.  many of these mines are still visible today, though mines on the floor bed of Gower Gulch have been filled in with sediment from past floods.

Diversion
In 1941 a  Furnace Creek-Gower Gulch Flood diversion channel was blasted upstream from Zabriskie Point to divert flood waters from the Furnace Creek Wash and the resorts into Gower Gulch.  The diversion increased the size of Gower Gulch's drainage basin from 2.77 km2 to 455.63 km2, an increase of 16,348%.  As a result, massive erosion of the channel took place as debris from Furnace Creek were channeled into Gower Gulch.  Today the diversion has sunk to over 20 feet deep with two dry falls, one three feet and another ten feet high.

References
Death Valley Historic Resource Study A History of Mining
Schultz, Lisa (2005). "Investigation of the Transient Response of Gower Gulch to Forced Diversion, Death Valley, California." Boston College, The Graduate School of Arts and Sciences, Department of Geology and Geophysics.

See also
Category: Death Valley

Death Valley
Landforms of Inyo County, California
Canyons and gorges of California